Minuscule 1813, designated by number 1813 (in the Gregory-Aland numbering), ε 3047 (Soden), is a Greek minuscule manuscript of the New Testament, written on 235 parchment leaves (22.5 by 14.9 cm). Paleografically it had been assigned to the 11th century (or 12th).

Description 

It contains a complete text of the four Gospels. It is written in a roundish cursive hand. The writing is in one column per page, in 26-27 lines per page. It contains Synaxarion and Menologion.

Text 
Kurt Aland did not place the Greek text of the codex in any Category.
According to the Claremont Profile Method it represents textual family Kr in Luke 1 and Luke 20. In Luke 10 no profile was made. It creates a pair with 966.

History 

The name of scribe was Hierotheos.
Formerly it was kept in the monastery in Soumela (Ms. 82), in Trebizond. Purchased on 1961 for $ 2 380.

Currently the codex is located in the Kenneth Willis Clark Collection of the Duke University (Gk MS 25)  at Durham.

See also 
 List of New Testament minuscules (1001-2000)
 Biblical manuscripts
 Textual criticism

References

Further reading 

 Kurt Treu, Die Griechischen Handschriften des Neuen Testaments in der USSR; eine systematische Auswertung des Texthandschriften in Leningrad, Moskau, Kiev, Odessa, Tbilisi und Erevan, T & U 91 (Berlin: 1966), p. 325. 
 Hermann von Soden, Die Schriften des Neues Testament in ihrer altesten erreichbaren Textgestalt (Berlin, 1907), p. 191.

External links 
 Minuscule 1813 at the Kenneth Willis Clark Collection of Greek Manuscripts

Greek New Testament minuscules
11th-century biblical manuscripts
Duke University Libraries